Hypotia myalis is a species of snout moth in the genus Hypotia. It was described by Rothschild in 1913, and is known from the Canary Islands, the central Sahara desert and Algeria.

The length of the forewings is 9–12 mm for males and 15-16.5 mm for females. The forewings are brownish buff, densely clothed with brownish rufous scales. The hindwings are buffish wood-grey, densely clothed with sandy rufous scales.

References

Hypotiini
Moths described in 1913